Pseudoclitarchus sentus is the sole representative of the genus Pseudoclitarchus, and is a stick insect endemic to the Three Kings Islands.  It lives mainly on kanuka trees.

References

Phasmatidae of New Zealand
Three Kings Islands
Endemic fauna of New Zealand
Phasmatidae
Phasmatodea genera
Monotypic insect genera
Endemic insects of New Zealand